Kil-Choo Moon is a leading Korean engineer and environmental scientist and President of the International Union of Air Pollution Prevention and Environmental Protection Associations (IUAPPA). He has served as President of the Korea Institute of Science and Technology and of the Korea University of Science and Technology and a Distinguished Professor of Korea University.

Academic background and professional experience
Kil-Choo Moon studied Mechanical Engineering, University of Ottawa (B.S.,1978), Canada;  Mechanical Engineering, University of Minnesota (M.S.,1980) and Mechanical Engineering (Particle Technology, Air Pollution Group) (Ph.D.,1984).

Kil-Choo Moon was Director, Directorate for National Science and Engineering Programs, National Research Foundation of Korea; Vice President KIST (2006-2009); Director, Global Environmental Research Center, KIST (1997-2001), Director, Environment Research Center, KIST (1992-1997).

Professional responsibilities
Executive President, IUAPPA (2010-)
Executive Vice President, IUAPPA (2004-2010)
President, Korea Society for Atmospheric Environment (KOSAE) (2008-2009)
Chairman, A&WMA Korean Section (1997-2008)
President, Korean Association for Aerosol and Particle Research (KAPAR) (1996-1997)
Member, Air and Waste Management Association|Air & Waste Management Association (AWMA)
Member, Society of Automotive Engineering (SAE)
Member, American Association for Aerosol Research (AAAR)

Awards
Member, National Academy of Engineering of Korea (NAEK)
Ungbi Medal, Order of Science and Technology Merit (2006)
Scientific Award, KOSAE (2004)
Certification of Honor, IUAPPA, England (2001)
 Ministry Citation, Ministry of Environment (1994)

Selected publications
Kil-Choo Moon:Charging Mechanism of Submicron Diesel Particles, University of Minnesota, 1984 - 484 pages
Kil-Choo Moon et al.:Fine particle measurements at two background sites in Korea between 1996 and 1997, Atmospheric Environment, Volume 35, Issue 4, 2001, Pages 635–643

External links
Korea Institute of Science and Technology
IUAPPA

References

South Korean scientists
South Korean engineers